Ian Paul Nelson (born September 5, 1982) is an American actor. He is best known for his roles as Brian in Keith and Brady Carter in What Goes On.

Personal life
Ian is the founder and executive producer of Bubba's Chop Shop, an award-winning post-production studio located in Burbank, California.
Nelson and actress/singer Skyler Day announced their engagement on December 11, 2015. Nelson and Day married in Camarillo, California on September 30, 2017.

Filmography

Film

Television

References

External links

Actors from Madison, Wisconsin
1982 births
Living people
Male actors from Wisconsin
American male film actors
American male television actors
21st-century American male actors